Pavlos Correa  (born 14 July 1998) is a Cypriot professional footballer who plays for Cypriot First Division club Anorthosis Famagusta. He plays as a centre-back.

Career

Anorthosis
Correa made his debut for Anorthosis in a match against AEK Larnaca.

On 22 June 2020, Anorthosis announced the renewal of Correa's contract until 2023.

On 27 May 2022, Correa signed a two-year contract extension with Anorthosis, running until 31 May 2024.

Loan to Aris Limassol
On 1 July 2018, Correa joined Aris Limassol on loan until the end of the season. He plays with Aris Limassol for 16 games and scores 1 goal.

Loan to Ethnikos Achna
On 24 January 2020, Correa joined Ethnikos Achna on loan until the end of the season. He played with Ethnikos Achna for 5 games.

Career statistics

International career
Correa was born in Cyprus to a Panamanian father and Greek mother. He is a youth international for Cyprus.

Correa made his international debut with Cyprus National Team on 5 June 2022, in a UEFA Nations League match against Northern Ireland at AEK Arena, as a starter in Cyprus' 0–0 draw.

Honours

Club
Anorthosis
Cypriot Cup
Winner: 2020–21

References

External links

1998 births
Living people
People from Paphos
Cypriot footballers
Cyprus international footballers
Cyprus youth international footballers
Cypriot people of Panamanian descent
Sportspeople of Panamanian descent
Anorthosis Famagusta F.C. players
Aris Limassol FC players
Cypriot First Division players
Cypriot Second Division players
Association football defenders